The chestnut tree mouse (Pogonomys macrourus) is a species of rodent in the family Muridae.
It is found in Indonesia and Papua New Guinea.

References

Pogonomys
Mammals described in 1877
Taxonomy articles created by Polbot
Taxa named by Henri Milne-Edwards